Greatest American Waltzes is a studio album recorded by American entertainer Connie Francis.

Background
An album containing waltzes popular in the US had already been planned in 1961 but had been abandoned in favor of other album projects.

A second attempt was made in 1963 and was recorded on June 18 and 19 that year at Owen Bradley's studio Bradley Film & Recording in Nashville. Arrangements were provided by Bill McElhiney who also conducted the sessions. Background vocals came from Millie Kirkham and The Jordanaires.

Track listing

Side A

Side B

References

Connie Francis albums
1963 albums
MGM Records albums
Albums arranged by Bill McElhiney
Albums conducted by Bill McElhiney
Albums produced by Danny Davis (country musician)